Kelvin Parnell Upshaw (born January 24, 1963) is an American former professional basketball player. He is  a 6'2" (1.88 m) 180 lb (82 kg) guard and played competitively at Chicago's Marshall High School, Northeastern Oklahoma A&M College and the University of Utah. He played 120 games in the National Basketball Association (NBA) from 1988 to 1991 averaging 5.4 ppg, 2.1 apg and 1.2 rpg in 12.6 mpg.

Upshaw played with the Miami Heat, the Boston Celtics, the Golden State Warriors and with the Dallas Mavericks. He also played professionally in Stargard Szczeciński, Poland (Komfort Stargard Szczec), Italy (Scavolini Pesaro), Argentina, Philippines, and in the CBA with the Quad City Thunder, Albany Patroons, Rapid City and Jacksonville Jets. He was selected in the second round of the 1986 CBA Draft by the Jets.

After spending the 1986–1987 season with the Jacksonville (later Mississippi) Jets, Upshaw signed with the West Palm Beach Stingrays of the USBL in the spring of 1987. The Jets cut Upshaw on May 26, 1987, due to injury but recalled Upshaw in late June. Upshaw returned to the Mississippi Jets later in 1987 and was selected to the 1988 CBA All-Star Game. Upshaw later played for the CBA's Rapid City Thrillers for the rest of the season.

Upshaw signed with the Palm Beach Stingrays in June 1988. Upshaw then played for the CBA's Albany Patroons for most of the 1988–1989 season. In January 1989, Upshaw signed with the NBA's Miami Heat. In two ten-day contracts with the Heat, Upshaw played in nine games and averaged 6.8 points, 1.5 rebounds, 3.7 assists. Upshaw re-joined the Patroons on February 7.  The NBA's Boston Celtics signed Upshaw in March 1989 to relieve the injured Ramón Rivas. Upshaw played in 23 games for the Celtics averaging 6.3 points, 1.4 rebounds, and 2.2 assists. The Boston Globe noted at the time, "Upshaw has brought to Boston instant up-tempo offense along with tough, chest-to-chest defense against some of the league's best (Isiah Thomas, Mo Cheeks), as well as a certain sang froid in delivering the big jumper."

A week after being waived, Upshaw re-signed with the Celtics on November 24, 1989, and was waived again on December 26, 1989. In 14 games at the beginning of the  season with Boston, Upshaw averaged 7.0 points, 1.6 rebounds, and 4.2 assists.

Upshaw signed the first of two ten-day contracts with the Dallas Mavericks on January 6, 1990, and played three games with the Mavericks with very few minutes per game. On February 28, 1990, Upshaw signed a season-long contract with the Golden State Warriors and averaged 5.6 points in 23 games.

Upshaw signed with the Dallas Mavericks on November 12, 1990, and re-signed on December 29 five days after being waived. In 48 games, Upshaw had one start and averaged 5.6 points.

In 1991, Upshaw played in the Philippine Basketball Association for the Swift Mighty Meaties then went on to join the CBA's Bakersfield Jammers and was traded to the Fort Wayne Fury in a dispersal draft after the Jammers folded. In the summer of 1992, Upshaw returned to play in the Philippine Basketball Association this time with Shell Rimula X before joining the Fury. In February 1993, Upshaw left the Fury to spend time with his family and work at a youth center.

Upshaw was meted a lifetime ban from the PBA for violating the league's anti-drug policy. But he gained notoriety with Filipino basketball fans for showing his butt to the crowd during a televised game in 1992.

He has served as an assistant coach for the CBA's Gary Steelheads, Quad City Thunder, LaCrosse Bobcats, and the NBDL's Charleston Lowgators.

In 2004, he was named as player development coach for the Dallas Mavericks.

References

External links
NBA stats  @ basketballreference.com

1963 births
Living people
21st-century African-American people
African-American basketball coaches
African-American basketball players
Albany Patroons players
American expatriate basketball people in Argentina
American expatriate basketball people in Italy
American expatriate basketball people in the Philippines
American expatriate basketball people in Poland
American men's basketball coaches
American men's basketball players
Bakersfield Jammers players
Basketball players from Chicago
Boston Celtics players
Continental Basketball Association coaches
Dallas Mavericks players
Gimnasia y Esgrima de Comodoro Rivadavia basketball players
Golden State Warriors players
Jacksonville Jets (CBA) players
Miami Heat players
Mississippi Jets players
Northeastern Oklahoma A&M Golden Norsemen basketball players
Philippine Basketball Association imports
Point guards
Pop Cola Panthers players
Quad City Thunder players
Rapid City Thrillers players
Shooting guards
Spójnia Stargard players
Undrafted National Basketball Association players
Utah Utes men's basketball players
United States Basketball League players
20th-century African-American sportspeople